Puli Alam, also spelled Pul-i-Alam or Pol-e Alam, is the provincial capital of Logar Province, Afghanistan as well as of Puli Alam District. The population of the district is estimated to be around 108,000, and is composed of ethnic Pashtuns and Tajiks.
The city of Puli Alam itself had a population of 22,914 in 2015. it has 4 districts and a total land area of 3,752 hectares. The total number of dwellings in the city is 2,546.

In August 2021, Puli Alam was seized by Taliban fighters as part of the wider 2021 Taliban offensive.

History
Puli Alam underwent a lot of reconstruction work after the fall of the Taliban government.

A provincial reconstruction team, PRT Logar of the Czech Republic, was based in Puli Alam.

Climate
Puli Alam is at high altitude. It features a hot-summer humid continental climate (Dsa) under the Köppen climate classification. It has hot, dry summers and cold, snowy winters. The average temperature in Puli Alam is 11.0 °C, while the annual precipitation averages 291 mm.

July is the hottest month of the year with an average temperature of 24.7 °C. The coldest month, January, has an average temperature of -6.8 °C.

Land use
Puli Alam is an urban village in eastern Afghanistan. Agriculture is the dominant land use, accounting for 49% of total land. Only 19% of land is classified as built-up, and 48% of this area is described as vacant plots. In Districts 1–3, the majority of the dwellings are regular houses.

Notable people
Mohammad Nabi
Gulbadin Naib

References

External links
AIMS District Map

Logar Province
Populated places in Logar Province
Provincial capitals in Afghanistan